Chrysocentris is a genus of sedge moths. Species of this genus are known only from African countries, except  Chrysocentris ditiorana which is widespread and occurs also in Asia and Australia.

Species
 Chrysocentris chalcotypa (Bradley, 1965) (from Congo)
 Chrysocentris chrysozona (Meyrick, 1921) (South Africa)
 Chrysocentris clavaria Meyrick, 1914 (from Malawi)
 Chrysocentris costella Viette, 1957 (from Réunion)
 Chrysocentris ditiorana (Walker, 1863) (from Africa, Asia, Australia)
 Chrysocentris eupepla Meyrick, 1930 (from Madagascar)
 Chrysocentris infuscata  Ghesquière, 1940 (from Congo)
 Chrysocentris phaeometalla  Meyrick, 1937 (from Congo)
 Chrysocentris urania  Meyrick, 1920 (from South Africa)

References

External links
 Chrysocentris at Zipcodezoo.com
 Chrysocentris at Global Species

Glyphipterigidae
Ditrysia genera